WSHJ (88.3 FM) is a high school radio station broadcasting an Urban Contemporary format. Licensed to Southfield, Michigan it first began broadcasting in 1967.

References

Michiguide.com - WSHJ History

External links

SHJ
Urban contemporary radio stations in the United States
Radio stations established in 1967